Generation X is the demographic cohort following baby boomers.

Generation X may also refer to:

 Generation X (1965 book), a book on popular youth culture by Charles Hamblett and Jane Deverson
 Generation X (band), a 1970s/1980s punk band fronted by Billy Idol
 Generation X (album), an album by the band
 Generation X: Tales for an Accelerated Culture, a 1991 novel by Douglas Coupland
 Generation X (comics), a comic book series published by Marvel Comics
 Generation X (film), a 1996 television film based on the comics
 D-Generation X, a World Wrestling Entertainment professional wrestling stable
 "X Generation", a song by Pennywise from the album All or Nothing

See also 
 Generation Y (disambiguation)